Richard James Logan (born 28 January 1980) is an English cricketer. He is a right-handed batsman and a right-arm medium-fast bowler.

Despite having played hockey at junior level, Logan's passion always lay in cricket, having represented England at Under-15, Under-17 and Under-19 levels. He joined Nottinghamshire in 2000, snubbing an offer from Northamptonshire.

Having suffered a shoulder injury in 2001, he returned and made an instant impact with 11 wickets in the following two matches. He stayed at Nottinghamshire for four years before switching to Hampshire in 2004.

In 2005 he helped Hampshire to a runners-up spot in the Frizzell County Championship.

In 2009 he played in the inaugural London T20 Cricket League where his team, Kensington & Chelsea were the eventual winners.

External links

Richard Logan at ECB

1980 births
Living people
English cricketers
Nottinghamshire cricketers
Hampshire cricketers
Northamptonshire cricketers
People educated at Wolverhampton Grammar School
People from Stone, Staffordshire
Berkshire cricketers
Cheshire cricketers
Surrey cricketers